Yan Yunxiang is a Professor of Social Anthropology and Director of Center for Chinese Studies at UCLA. He is known for his field work studies in Xiajia Village, Northeastern China.

Yan Yunxiang is also a featured subject, together with Shi Tianjian and Emily Wu, in Chris Billing's 2005 documentary Up to the Mountain, Down to the Village. From 1968 onwards more than 17 million high school students and young adults were sent "up to the mountain, down to the village" (上山下乡 shang shan, xia xiang) to "learn from the peasants." In the documentary three of those youngsters revisit the remote villages to which they were sent thirty years ago.

Career landmarks

Publications
 Private Life under Socialism. Stanford: University Press, 2003
 The Individualization of Chinese Society. Oxford & NY: Berg, 2009

Awards
 2010:  The Guggenheim Fellowship of the John Simon Guggenheim Memorial Foundation

References

University of California, Los Angeles faculty
Chinese anthropologists
Living people
Year of birth missing (living people)